The Monasterio de Tarlac is a Catholic monastery on top of Mount Resurrection, part of the Zambales Mountain Range on the island of Luzon in the Philippines. It is part of the Mount Resurrection Eco Park in Barangay Lubigan, San José, Tarlac. It houses a relic believed to be a fragment of the True Cross of Jesus.

References

Buildings and structures in Tarlac
Tourist attractions in Tarlac
Monasteries in the Philippines
Religion in Tarlac